Yunus Özel (born 18 August 1987) is a Turkish Greco-Roman wrestler. He is a silver medalist at the 2014 World Wrestling Championships.

References

External links 
 

Living people
Place of birth missing (living people)
Turkish male sport wrestlers
World Wrestling Championships medalists
Wrestlers at the 2015 European Games
1987 births
20th-century Turkish people
21st-century Turkish people